Canarium is a genus of about 100 species of tropical and subtropical trees, in the family Burseraceae.  They grow naturally across tropical Africa, south and southeast Asia, Indochina, Malesia, Australia and western Pacific Islands; including from southern Nigeria east to Madagascar, Mauritius, Sri Lanka and India; from Burma, Malaysia and Thailand through the Malay Peninsula and Vietnam to south China, Taiwan and the Philippines; through Borneo, Indonesia, Timor and New Guinea, through to the Solomon Islands, Vanuatu, New Caledonia, Fiji, Samoa, Tonga and Palau.

They are dioecious, with male and female flowers growing on separate trees.

Common names

The trees and their edible nuts have a large number of common names in their range.  These include Pacific almond, canarium nut, pili nut, Java almond, Kenari nut, galip nut, nangai, and ngali.

Species
This species listing was sourced from The Plant List data aggregation website that takes in some inaccurate data. The brief species distribution information was sourced from Flora Malesiana, the Flora of China (series) and the Australian Tropical Rainforest Plants information system.

 Canarium acutifolium  – New Guinea, Maluku, Sulawesi, New Britain, New Ireland, Bougainville, Qld Australia
 Canarium album  Chinese white olive (橄榄) – Taiwan, S China, Vietnam
 Canarium apertum  – Sumatra, Malay Peninsula, Borneo
 Canarium asperum  – New Guinea, Maluku, Sulawesi, Philippines, Borneo, Java, Sumbawa, Sumba, Flores, Timor, Solomon Is., 
 Canarium australasicum  – Qld, NSW, Australia endemic
 Canarium australianum  – New Guinea, Qld, NT, WA, Australia
 Canarium balansae  – New Caledonia endemic
 Canarium balsamiferum  – Maluku, Sulawesi
 Canarium batjanense  – 
 Canarium bengalense  – India, Burma, Laos, Thailand, S China
 Canarium caudatum  – Sumatra, Malay Peninsula, Borneo
 Canarium cestracion  – E New Guinea
 Canarium chinare  – Solomon Is., Admiralty Is.
 Canarium cinereum  – 
 Canarium copaliferum  – 
 Canarium decumanum  – E Borneo, Maluku, New Guinea, Sulawesi
 Canarium denticulatum  – Andaman Is., Burma, Sumatra, Malay Penin., Java, Borneo, Philippines
 Canarium dichotomum  – Sumatra, Borneo
 Canarium divergens  – Borneo
 Canarium elegans  — Madagascar
 Canarium engleri  – 
 Canarium euphyllum  – 
 Canarium euryphyllum  – Philippines
 Canarium fuscocalycinum  – Borneo
 Canarium gracile  – Philippines
 Canarium grandifolium  – Malay Peninsula
 Canarium harami  – 
 Canarium harveyi  – 
 Canarium hirsutum  – New Guinea to throughout Malesia, Solomon Is., Palau
 Canarium indicum  – New Guinea, New Britain, New Ireland, Solomon Is., Vanuatu, Maluku, Sulawesi
 Canarium intermedium  – S Sumatra
 Canarium kaniense  – New Guinea
 Canarium karoense  – N Sumatra
 Canarium kerrii  – 
 Canarium kinabaluense  – N Borneo
 Canarium kipella  – W Java
 Canarium kostermansii  – Borneo
 Canarium lamii  – New Guinea
 Canarium latistipulatum  – Borneo
 Canarium liguliferum  – 
 Canarium littorale  – Indo-China, Sumatra, Malay Peninsula, Java, Borneo
 Canarium luzonicum  – Philippines
 Canarium lyi  – 
 Canarium macadamii  – New Guinea
 Canarium madagascariense  – 
 Canarium maluense  – Sulawesi, Maluku, New Guinea, Borneo
 Canarium megacarpum  – New Guinea
 Canarium megalanthum  – Sumatra, Malay Peninsula, Borneo
 Canarium merrillii  – Borneo
 Canarium muelleri  – Queensland endemic, Australia
 Canarium odontophyllum  – Sumatra, Borneo, Philippines (Palawan)
 Canarium oleiferum  – New Caledonia endemic
 Canarium oleosum  – New Guinea, New Britain, Timor, Maluku, Sulawesi
 Canarium ovatum  – Philippines, cultivated Asia–Pacific
 Canarium paniculatum  – 
 Canarium parvum  – S China, Vietnam
 Canarium patentinervium  – Sumatra, Malay Peninsula, Banka, Borneo
 Canarium perlisanum  – Malay Peninsula (Perlis)
 Canarium pilososylvestre  – W New Guinea
 Canarium pilosum  – Sumatra, Malay Peninsula, Borneo
 subsp. borneensis  – Borneo
 Canarium pimela  Chinese black olive (乌榄) – Vietnam, Cambodia, Laos, S China
 Canarium polyphyllum  – New Guinea
 Canarium pseudodecumanum  – Sumatra, Malay Peninsula, Borneo
 Canarium pseudopatentinervium  – S Sumatra, Banka, Borneo
 Canarium pseudopimela  – 
 Canarium pseudosumatranum  – Malay Peninsula
 Canarium reniforme  – 
 Canarium resiniferum  – 
 Canarium rigidum  – New Guinea
 Canarium rotundifolium  – 
 Canarium sarawakanum  – 
 Canarium schweinfurthii  – African canarium; from Nigeria and Angola to Uganda
 Canarium sikkimense  – 
 Canarium solomonense  – New Guinea
 Canarium strictum  – India, Burma, S China
 Canarium subulatum  – Thailand, Vietnam, Cambodia, Laos, S China
 Canarium sumatranum  – Sumatra, Malay Peninsula
 Canarium sylvestre  – New Guinea, Maluku
 Canarium thorelianum  – 
 Canarium trifoliolatum  – New Caledonia endemic
 Canarium trigonum  – Sulawesi
 Canarium vanikoroense  – 
 Canarium venosum  – 
 Canarium vitiense  – Fiji, Solomon Is., Samoa, Tonga, New Guinea, Bismarck Arch., Admiralty Is., Louisiade Arch., Torres Strait I's, Qld Australia
 Canarium vittatistipulatum  – 
 Canarium vrieseanum  – Philippines, Sulawesi
 Canarium vulgare  – Flores, Timor, Sulawesi, Maluku
 Canarium whitei  – New Caledonia endemic
 Canarium zeylanicum  –

Uses and ecology
Several species have edible nuts, known as galip nut or nangae (C. indicum), pili nut (C. ovatum), or simply canarium nut (C. harveyi and C. indicum). C. indicum are among the most important nut-bearing trees in eastern Indonesia and the Southwest Pacific. C. ovatum is cultivated as a food crop only in the Philippines.

C. odontophyllum, known commonly as dabai or kembayau, is a species with a nutritious fruit with a creamy taste. It is hard when raw and may be pickled or softened with hot water when prepared. Many animals feed on the fruit in the wild, such as the red-bellied lemur (Eulemur rubriventer) and the ruffed lemurs (Varecia) of Madagascar's eastern tropical forests. Canarium fruit is also an important part of the diet of the aye-aye (Daubentonia madagascarensis).

Canarium album produces a fruit consumed in Vietnam, Thailand (where it is known as nam liap, samo chin or kana) and in China (Chinese: 橄欖) with an appearance of a big olive.

Canarium luzonicum, commonly known as elemi, is a tree native to the Philippines. An oleoresin, which contains Elemicin, is harvested from it.

Canarium strictum produces a resin called black dammar.

Superb fruit-doves (Ptilinopus superbus) are known to be fond of the fruit of scrub turpentine (C. australianum), which they swallow whole.

References

External links

 
Burseraceae genera
Dioecious plants